Václav Nejtek (23 September 1899 – 26 August 1958) was a Czech sculptor. His work was part of the sculpture event in the art competition at the 1936 Summer Olympics.

References

1899 births
1958 deaths
20th-century Czech sculptors
20th-century male artists
Czech male sculptors
Olympic competitors in art competitions